Revelation 1 is the first chapter of the Book of Revelation or the Apocalypse of John in the New Testament of the Christian Bible. The book is traditionally attributed to John the Apostle, but the precise identity of the author is a point of academic debate. This chapter contains the prologue of the book, followed by the vision and commission of John.

Text
The original text was written in Koine Greek. This chapter is divided into 20 verses.

Textual witnesses
Some early manuscripts containing the text of this chapter are among others:
Papyrus 98 (2nd century; extant verses 13–20)
Papyrus 18 (3rd/4th century; extant verses 4–7)
Codex Sinaiticus (330-360)
Codex Alexandrinus (400-440)
Codex Ephraemi Rescriptus (c. 450; extant verses 3-20)

Old Testament references
Among the Old Testament references in this chapter, about half of them in the verses 7–20 come from the Book of Daniel, especially Daniel 7 and 10. Beale, therefore, regards this part of the chapter as a "midrash." (A midrash is an ancient commentary on part of the Hebrew scriptures.) Those two chapters of Daniel describe the "Son of man," which is used by John as a model in the framework of his writing, as partially listed in the following table:

Others
 Revelation 1:7: ; Zechariah 12:10
 Revelation 1:13:

Prologue (1:1–8)
The prologue to this book, similar to the one of the Gospel of John, is a kind of overture, announcing the main themes while providing the readers with a vantage point to interpret the visions that follow. This part shares some features and forms an inclusio with the epilogue (Revelation 22:6–21).

Verse 1
The revelation from Jesus Christ, which God gave him to show his servants what must soon take place. He made it known by sending his angel to his servant John,
"Revelation": or "apocalypse" (cf.). This term is used by biblical scholars for a literary genre. The meaning of this Greek word is "to lay bare, make naked, to disclose a truth which before was unknown", or "a manifestation or an appearance of a person" (in this case, the appearance of Jesus Christ; cf. ). This opening verse states that God the Father sent his messenger (the involvement of holy angels as in the Torah; cf. ) to make known to John the apostle previously undisclosed truths about the person of the resurrected Christ, which is the main theme of the book.  Angels are mentioned over 70 times in the Book of Revelation, and in every chapter except two (4, 13).
"From Jesus Christ": the Greek form of "Jesus Christ" is subjective genitive, denoting Jesus as the author, not the subject, of the book, and he is shown as the revealer throughout the book.
"Must soon take place": The anticipation is that these previously unknown events would materialize on the world stage imminently, in line with the notion that "it is the last time".
 For discussion of the identity of "John", see Authorship of the Johannine works.

Verse 2
Who bore witness to the word of God, and to the testimony of Jesus Christ, to all things that he saw.
John, who had the last word in the canonical order of the gospels, also has the last word of the New Testament as he bears witness and testifies to that which he has seen and heard, two words which he frequently uses in all genres of his writings to describe a special function in his ministry: his firsthand accounts of the words and works of Christ (John 21:24, Revelation 1:2).
"The testimony of Jesus Christ" in the book of Revelation is essentially the same testimony Jesus gave during his earthly ministry, which primarily concerned 'his coming Kingdom' and 'the future of the nation of Israel'.

Verse 3
Blessed is he who reads and those who hear the words of this prophecy, and keep those things which are written in it; for the time is near.
 This is the first of the so-called 'seven beatitudes' in the book of Revelation (cf. 14:13, 16:15; 19:9; 20:6; 22:7, 14), which are pronounced on the readers, the hearers (to whom the book are read aloud, according to the custom in the antiquity) and those who heed the message (Revelation 1:3, 22:7;  cf. 1 Timothy 4:13).
"For the time is near": may refer to b about the time when "the saints will take possession of the kingdom".

Verse 4

John, to the seven churches which are in Asia:Grace to you and peace from Him who is and who was and who is to come, and from the seven Spirits who are before His throne.  The number 7 occurs 58 times in The Revelation with its first appearance here in Rev 1:4.
 Evangelical Tom Meyer notes that, like Paul—who is traditionally said to have written to seven churches (in Thessalonica, Galatia, Corinth, Philippi, Rome, Colossae, Ephesus)—John also writes to seven churches: in Ephesus, Smyrna, Pergamum, Thyatira, Sardis, Philadelphia, and Laodicea, which are in the province of Asia. 
"Grace": In this customary apostolic greeting John summarizes God's redemptive plan by extending grace and peace to the seven churches, giving the completeness (Shalom, translated "peace") which is in Christ.

Verse 5and from Jesus Christ the faithful witness, the firstborn of the dead, and the ruler of kings on earth.To him who loves us and has freed us from our sins by his blood,"Faithful witness": as Jesus testifies the truth, to be the model for Christians who died as "witnesses". This is the first of many titles given to the risen Christ in the Book of Revelation, which would remind any reader intimate with the Hebrew Bible of the same title given to YHWH: "the LORD be a true and faithful witness between us" (Jeremiah 42:5); thus, John equates the divinity and unity of the Father and the Son who came “to bear witness unto the truth” (John 18:37).
 The blessing in verses 4–5 is trinitarian with a complex background. The first element reflects the name of God as revealed to Moses with the interpretation of contemporary Jews which expands 'I am who I am' to 'I am he who is, and who was, and I am he who will be' (Jerusalem Targum on Deuteronomy 32:20). The second element in the form of the seven spirits before his throne denotes the Holy Spirit (cf.). The third element, Jesus, is given with an apt description for the believers, that is, as 'the supreme witness for God, and he died on account of his witness' (cf.), whereas the Greek term 'witness' has become the English word 'martyr'.
"The firstborn from the dead, and the ruler of the kings of the earth": are the second and third titles used in this book to describe the risen Christ, originating from the Psalms, sucn as Psalm 89:27, which emphasizes the eternality of God's Covenant with the House of David: "Also I will make him my firstborn, higher than the kings of the earth."
 The last stanza of this verse may be quoted from Jacob's last message in Genesis 49 from the section relating to Judah (the tribe of the Christ): "he washed his garments in wine, and his clothes in the blood of grapes", as the Targum's of Jonathan and Jerusalem as well as the Babylon Talmud (Berakoth 57a) interpret this statement from Genesis 49 to be of the Messiah.

Verse 6
 and has made us to be a kingdom and priests to serve his God and Father — to him be glory and power for ever and ever! Amen."Kingdom and priests": are 'the vocation promised to Israel', which is extended to the church (1 Peter 2:9).

Verse 7Behold, He is coming with clouds, and every eye will see Him, even they who pierced Him. And all the tribes of the earth will mourn because of Him. Even so, Amen.This verse is an appendix to the salutation, in which John summarizes the Second Coming of Christ as a divine warrior king by drawing upon a well-known Jewish motif of the Messiah coming on the clouds found in the Hebrew Bible and in the New Testament as well as related to his departure in a cloud: "and a cloud received him out of their sight" that he will return in like manner. As in his gospel, John quotes Zechariah 12:10: "they shall look upon me whom they have pierced" in this verse.

Verse 8
 I am Alpha and Omega, the beginning and the ending, saith the Lord, which is, and which was, and which is to come, the Almighty. Cross reference: Isaiah 44:6
 Scrivener's Textus Receptus: ; . Westcott and Hort: .
 Modern translations report the opening words of this verse as "I am the Alpha and the Omega", but the word "the" did not appear in older versions such as the Geneva Bible and the King James Version.
 God speaks here for the first time regarding his eternal nature, quoting Isaiah 44:6: "thus saith the LORD the King of Israel, and his redeemer the LORD of hosts; I am the first, and I am the last; and beside me there is no God." John's three-fold statement of "who is, who was, and who is to come" is paralleled by a rabbinical pronouncement: “The seal of God is emet,” (Yomba 69b; Emet, meaning “truth” contains the first, the middle, and the last letters of the [Hebrew] alphabet, as Jews draw on Yomba 69b to say God is the beginning, the middle, and the end of all things.). Josephus also described God as "the beginning, middle, and end of all things” (Against Apion 2.190). The title "the Almighty" means having dominion over all, and is translated in the LXX as "the Lord of Hosts."

Although Revelation 1:8 is sometimes used to assert Jesus Christ is God. nearly all scholarly authorities on the book of Revelation have interpreted the speaker in Rev 1.8 as God the Father, not Jesus Christ.

G.R. Beasley-Murray says of Jesus therein, “Older expositors sometimes thought that Jesus  is the speaker here also, but clearly the view is mistaken; it is spoken by the ‘Lord God’ (RV) … the Almighty,” 

John's Vision and Commission (1:9–20)

John received the vision as the occasion of his call to receive and write the book of Revelation while he had been banished to Patmos due to his preaching of the word of God and the testimony of Jesus Christ. The manner he received his visions was similar to how Old Testament prophets Isaiah (Isaiah 6), Jeremiah (Jeremiah 1), Daniel (Daniel 10), and Ezekiel (Ezekiel 1) received theirs.

Verse 9I, John, both your brother and companion in the tribulation and kingdom and patience of Jesus Christ, was on the island that is called Patmos for the word of God and for the testimony of Jesus Christ."Patmos": is present day Patino, a small island in the Aegean Sea. Pliny the Elder in his Natural History says the site is "about thirty miles in circumference; and it lay next to the churches (of Asia Minor) on the continent, and is said to be about forty miles southwest of Ephesus, from whence John came thither, and to which church he writes first; how he came here he does not say, concealing, through modesty, his sufferings he did not come here of his own accord." Not much information can be found from the ancient writings about the specific charge that put John in exile here apart from his own testimony "because of the witness about Jesus," except from a few writings of the church fathers: Ignatius in his Epistle to Tarsus says that John was banished to Patmos by Domitian emperor of Rome and Irenaeus in his Against Heresies says it happened at the latter end of Domitian's reign, about the year 95 or 96.

Verse 10I was in the Spirit on the Lord’s Day, and I heard behind me a loud voice, as of a trumpet,John, like the Old Testament Hebrew prophets, speaks the oracles of God in the Spirit, similar to in the Old Testament (cf. Zechariah 7:12).
"The Lord's Day": refers to Sunday, the weekly day of Christian worship. This day can also be rendered as the "day of the Lord," and called "the Tribulation," a dispensation (time) in which God will deal with wicked men directly and dramatically in judgment, which is followed by a time of peace with Christ physically ruling from Jerusalem. The events of the Day of the Lord are: the ultimate overthrow of God's enemies, the day of national deliverance for the nation of Israel, and a day of salvation for Israel (Zechariah 12:10), and the Tribulation (cf. ,), which will not be brief as it is comparable to a woman's labor before giving birth, preceding Christ's appearance (which won't happen until this period has run its course; cf. Revelation chapters 6-19)."

The seven churches are named in the proper order, beginning at Ephesus, the nearest to Patmos, proceeding in a circle along the Roman postal route.

 Verse 12 Then I turned to see the voice that spoke with me. And having turned I saw seven golden lampstands, The imagery of seven golden lampstands refers to the seven-branched lampstand in the Jerusalem Temple.
These seven lampstands like those which decorated the interior of the Tabernacle: “and thou shalt make the seven lamps” are comparable to those in the vision of Zechariah: “and his seven lamps”, as in the tabernacle, natural light was excluded and only the lampstands would emanate light.

"Son of Man": is used by Old Testament authors and most frequently in the New Testament by Jesus to call himself (over 30 times).
"A garment": the same garment of rank worn by the High Priest during the Mosaic dispensation is worn by Christ; the same Greek word is used for "ephod" in the LXX as well as by Josephus, who also states that the High Priest's robe "went down to the feet" (Antiquities 1.3.7.4).
"Girded …with a golden band": same as the girdle of the ephod for the priest: "and the curious girdle of the ephod…shall be of gold". According to the Talmud, the priests did not gird themselves in the place in which they sweat, that is to say, they did not gird neither below their loins, nor above their armpits, but only across the chest (Zevachim 18b), like Christ here, emphasizing that "the risen Christ now functions as the High Priest for his kingdom of priests".

 Verse 14 His head and hair were white like wool, as white as snow, and His eyes like a flame of fire; Christ in his resurrected state still identifies with mankind as well as with his obvious divine nature as John describes him in language characteristic of Old Testament descriptions of God such as the Ancient of days whose hair was like the pure wool: "and the hair of his head like the pure wool" and the messenger in a vision of Daniel who had eyes as lamps of fire: "and his eyes as lamps of fire".

 Verse 15 His feet were like fine brass, as if refined in a furnace, and His voice as the sound of many waters;The Old Testament prophets also state about the feet of the Lord that is bare and like glowing brass as the priest would also be bare foot in the Holy Place (Babylonian Talmud Sotah 40a) as well as the voice of the Almighty "like a noise of many waters".

 Verse 16 He had in His right hand seven stars, out of His mouth went a sharp two-edged sword, and His countenance was like the sun shining in its strength."The right hand" is the clean hand (Psalm 118:16) to securely protect the leaders of the churches.

Verse 17When I saw him, I fell at his feet as though dead. Then he placed his right hand on me and said: "Do not be afraid. I am the First and the Last." The reaction of John to 'the vision of the exalted Lord' is similar to that of those with such experiences (cf. ). Manoah was afraid that he should die, but did not fall down as dead; Ezekiel fell on his face, but still had his senses; Daniel lost his strength, he fainted, and fell into a deep sleep; but John fell down at once, as dead. This panic of those good men arose from a notion that people would die when they ever saw God; that's why Jacob wonders, and is thankful, that he had seen God face to face, but stayed alive. This was also a customary position to assume when desiring to show respect (cf. ). 
"The First and the Last": is a virtual exposition of Alpha and Omega in verse 8 (cf. Isaiah 44:6).
"Do not be afraid": Same as here, Christ once told John not to be afraid when he stilled the storm: "it is I, be not afraid", which also mirrors the same words of comfort to the prophet Daniel: "fear not Daniel", and also often used in the Old Testament to comfort the people of Israel and remove their fear: "I the LORD, the first, and with the last"."

Verse 18 I am the Living One; I was dead, and now look, I am alive for ever and ever! And I hold the keys of death and Hades."Hades": here as synonym of Death.
"Hold the keys" indicates total authority, as also in Matthew 16:19; cf. ).

 Verse 19 Write the things which you have seen, and the things which are, and the things which will take place after this.This verse contains a summary of the contents of the book of Revelation, that is to write what John had previously seen in the vision of the resurrected Christ (chapter 1), then the current explained condition of the apostolic churches (chapters 2-3), and finally the culmination of history yet to be narrated in the following chapters (chapters 4-20).

 Verse 20 The mystery of the seven stars which you saw in My right hand, and the seven golden lampstands: The seven stars are the angels of the seven churches, and the seven lampstands which you saw are the seven churches.The stars and lampstands are the sacred interpretation of the symbolism of the heavenly and earthly lights.
"Seven stars": here refer to the seven churches in Asia Minor, whereas the "twelve stars" in other parts of the Bible (Revelation 12:1) represent the 'twelve tribes of Israel', not the church. Bullinger notes that there was an officer in the synagogues who was called Sheliach Tzibbur or the "Angel of the Assembly" (tzibbur mean "the Assembly"; sheliach means "angel; legate" or "the sent one; messenger") and functions as a cantor or mouthpiece of the congregation, the leader of the divine worship. His duty was to offer up public prayer to God for the whole congregation, that is, as the messenger of the assembly, he spoke to God for them. This position is below the chief officer or Archisynagogos'' ("Ruler of the Synagogue"). The use of the word "synagogue" in two of the seven letters (Revelation 2:9 and 3:9) gives support this interpretation.

See also
 Acts of Apostles
 John the Apostle
 Greek alphabet: Alpha, Chi, Omega, Rho
 Names and titles of Jesus in the New Testament: Alpha and Omega
 Seven Spirits of God
 John's vision of the Son of Man
 Seven churches of Asia
 Related Bible parts: Daniel 7, Zechariah 12, Revelation 2, Revelation 3, Revelation 21, Revelation 22

Notes

References

Sources

External links
 King James Bible - Wikisource
English Translation with Parallel Latin Vulgate 
Online Bible at GospelHall.org (ESV, KJV, Darby, American Standard Version, Bible in Basic English)
Multiple bible versions at Bible Gateway (NKJV, NIV, NRSV etc.)

01